Nicholson Island is an alluvial island in the Allegheny River in South Buffalo Township, Armstrong County in the U.S. state of Pennsylvania. The island is situated across from Bethel Township.

The elevation of Nicholson Island is 768 feet above sea level.

Emergency personnel rescued stranded boaters from the island on July 24, 2015.

References

External links
U.S. Army Corps of Engineers navigation charts

River islands of Pennsylvania
Islands of the Allegheny River in Pennsylvania
Landforms of Armstrong County, Pennsylvania